Lars Knudsen is a Danish film producer. In 2004, he and producer Jay Van Hoy founded Parts & Labor, a production company dedicated to director-driven, collaborative filmmaking. Parts & Labor has produced more than 20 films including Frank & Lola, The Witch, American Honey, Ain't Them Bodies Saints, and Beginners, and help bring their stories to life for directors like Andrea Arnold or Robert Eggers. In 2016, after 15 years, Knudsen and Van Hoy decided to part ways. Prior to the release of Midsommar in June of 2019, Knudsen and director Ari Aster announced the launch of their new production company, Square Peg. Knudsen is best known for his work with Midsommar (2019), Hereditary (2018), and The Witch (2015).

Selected filmography
 Old Joy (2006)
 Wild Tigers I Have Known (2006)
 Gretchen (2006)
 Treeless Mountain (2008)
 Lovely, Still (2008)
 The Exploding Girl (2009)
 Cold Weather (2010)
 Shit Year (2010)
 Beginners (2010)
 Here (2011)
 The Loneliest Planet (2011)
 Keep the Lights On (2012)
 Mother of George (2013)
 Ain't Them Bodies Saints (2013)
 Narco Cultura (2013)
 Love Is Strange (2014)
 The Heart Machine (2014)
 Loitering with Intent (2014)
 One More Time (2015)
 The Witch (2015)
 Little Men (2016)
 Complete Unknown (2016)
 Frank & Lola (2016)
 American Honey (2016)
 Love After Love (2017)
 Backstabbing for Beginners (2018)
 Hereditary (2018)
 A Vigilante (2018)
 Midsommar (2019)
 Resurrection (2022)
 The Northman (2022)
 Beau Is Afraid (2023)
 Dream Scenario (TBA)

References

External links

Living people
Danish film producers
Year of birth missing (living people)